Hoca is the Turkish spelling of the Persian word Khawaja (Persian: خواجه khwāja, khâjeh), used as a title, given name or surname.  

As a title, 'Hoca' (variant Hodja) means “master” and is commonly used for teachers, professors, leaders, and in general, wise people. It is also used as a slang word between friends.

It may refer to:

Adnan Hoca or Adnan Oktar (born 1956), also known as Harun Yahya, cult leader and Islamic creationist
Cinci Hoca (died 1648), Ottoman spiritualist
İskilipli Âtıf Hoca (1875–1926), Turkish Islamic scholar
Hoca Ali Rıza (1858–1939), Turkish painter
Hoca Çelebi or Ebussuud Efendi (1490–1574), Hanafi Ottoman jurist and Qur'an exegete
Hoca Niyaz or Hoja-Niyaz, Uyghur independence movement leader who led several rebellions in Xinjiang
Hoca Sadüddin Efendi (1536–1599), Ottoman scholar, official, historian, a teacher of Ottoman sultan Murad III
Hoca Sefer, captain, who was in charge of pro-Ottoman forces in Gujarat in the first half of the 15th century
Nasreddin Hoca or Nasreddin, Seljuq satirical Sufi figure (around 13th century)
Fatahillah or Hoca Hassan, Malay commander in the Malacca and Demak sultanates

See also
Hoxha (surname), Albanian surname of the same origin
Velika Hoča, village in Kosovo

Turkish-language surnames
Turkish masculine given names